3 Srikandi is a 2016 Indonesian biopic film directed by Iman Brotoseno. A film about three Indonesian archers who won Indonesia's first Olympic medal at the 1988 Seoul Olympics. Premiere, August 4, 2016.

Cast

 Reza Rahardian as Donald Pandiangan
 Bunga Citra Lestari as Nurfitriyana Saiman
 Chelsea Islan as Lilies Handayani
 Tara Basro as Kusuma Wardhani

References

External links 
 

2016 films
Indonesian biographical drama films
Films about the 1988 Summer Olympics